Lioglyphostoma ericea is a species of sea snail, a marine gastropod mollusk in the family Pseudomelatomidae, the turrids and allies.

Description
The length of the shell varies between 12 mm and 15 mm.

The light brown shell is slightly shouldered. The ribs continue to the sutures, nodulous below the shoulder, by the crossing of revolving lines.

Distribution
This marine species occurs in the Pacific Ocean off Panama, Costa Rica and the Galapagos Islands; also off the Angel de La Guarda Island, Gulf of California; off Isla Smith, Bahia de los Angeles, Baja California, Mexico.

References

 Hinds, Richard Brinsley. "Descriptions of new shells from the collection of Captain Sir Edward Belcher." The Annals and Magazine of Natural History 11 (1843): 255–257.

External links
 
 Gastropods.com: Lioglyphostoma ericea

ericea
Gastropods described in 1843